BVH is a three letter acronym that can stand for:
Biovision Hierarchy file format
Bounding volume hierarchy
Baron von Hack
Bahawal Victoria Hospital located in Bahawalpur Pakistan
Buried Via Holes a PCB technology
Blackpool Victoria Hospital located in Blackpool, Lancashire